The Kap Stewart Group is a geological group in eastern Greenland of Late Triassic (Rhaetian) to Early Jurassic (Sinemurian) age. It consists of a 155-600 m thick sequence of interbedded mudstones and fluvio-deltiac sandstones deposited in a "large wave and storm-dominated lake".

Description 
Originally known as the Kap Stewart Formation, it was later raised to Group status. It comprises three formations, the organic-rich lacustrine mudstones with interbedded sheet sandstones of the Rhætelv Formation (developed in the basin centre) the alluvial plain sandstone and conglomerate of the Innakajik Formation overlain by delta plain sandstones to mudstones of the Primulaelv Formation (both restricted to the basin margin).

References 

Geologic groups of Europe
Geologic groups of North America
Geologic formations of Greenland
Jurassic System of North America
Paleontology in Greenland